Bobby Mair is a Canadian stand-up comedian based in London, England. Mair has appeared on The Hour, Russell Howard's Good News, Sweat the Small Stuff, Virtually Famous, Never Mind the Buzzcocks, Sam Delaney's News Thing , 8 Out of 10 Cats and Live at The Rivermill. Mair won the Laughing Horse New Act Of The Year competition in 2012. He has supported Jerry Sadowitz, Doug Stanhope and Bill Burr.

Personal life 
Mair was born in Canada. He is adopted and has two half-siblings. He is married to comedian Harriet Kemsley. The build-up to the wedding was documented on Viceland show Bobby and Harriet Get Married.

He is a third cousin of Canadian pop star Justin Bieber; however, he says that they have never met - a fact mentioned many times, including in his Edinburgh Fringe show Obviously Adopted.

Mair cited his traumatic childhood on the ‘You’ll do’ podcast. He has been diagnosed with borderline personality disorder saying “It's a disease that has been in the public eye for years but never gets as much attention as bipolar or schizophrenia”. Mair suffered from alcohol and drug addiction.

References

External links 

1986 births
Living people
Canadian male comedians
Canadian stand-up comedians
Comedians from Toronto
Date of birth missing (living people)
People with borderline personality disorder